Gymnoscelis holoprasia is a moth in the Geometridaefamily. It was described by Louis Beethoven Prout in 1958. It is found on Bali.

References

Moths described in 1958
holoprasia